was a Japanese politician and statesman who served as the first Prime Minister of Japan. He was also a leading member of the genrō, a group of senior statesmen that dictated Japanese policy during the Meiji era. He was born as Hayashi Risuke, also known as Hirofumi, Hakubun, and briefly during his youth as Itō Shunsuke.

A London-educated samurai of the Chōshū Domain and a central figure in the Meiji Restoration, Itō Hirobumi chaired the bureau which drafted the Constitution for the newly formed Empire of Japan. Looking to the West for inspiration, Itō rejected the United States Constitution as too liberal and the Spanish Restoration as too despotic. Instead, he drew on British and German models, particularly the Prussian Constitution of 1850. Dissatisfied with Christianity's pervasiveness in European legal precedent, he replaced such religious references with those rooted in the more traditionally Japanese concept of a kokutai or "national polity" which hence became the constitutional justification for imperial authority.

During the 1880s, Itō emerged as the most powerful figure in the Meiji government. By 1885, he became the first Prime Minister of Japan, a position he went on to hold four times (thereby making his tenure one of the longest in Japanese history). A staunch monarchist, Itō favored a large, all-powerful bureaucracy which answered solely to the Emperor and opposed the formation of political parties. His third term as Prime Minister was ended in 1898 by the opposition's consolidation into the Kenseitō party, prompting him to found the Rikken Seiyūkai party to counter its rise. In 1901, he resigned his fourth and final ministry upon tiring of party politics.

On the world stage, Itō presided over an ambitious foreign policy. He strengthened diplomatic ties with the Western powers including Germany, the United States and especially the United Kingdom. In Asia, he oversaw the First Sino-Japanese War and negotiated the surrender of China's ruling Qing dynasty on terms aggressively favourable to Japan, including the annexation of Taiwan and the release of Korea from the Chinese Imperial tribute system. While expanding his country's claims in Asia, Itō sought to avoid conflict with the Russian Empire through the policy of Man-Kan kōkan – the proposed surrender of Manchuria to Russia's sphere of influence in exchange for recognition of Japanese hegemony in Korea. However, in a diplomatic visit to Saint Petersburg in November 1901, Itō found Russian authorities completely unreceptive to such terms. Consequently, Japan's incumbent Prime Minister, Katsura Tarō, elected to abandon the pursuit of Man-Kan kōkan, which resulted in an escalation of tensions culminating in the Russo-Japanese War.

After Japanese forces emerged victorious over Russia, the ensuing Japan–Korea Treaty of 1905 made Itō the first Japanese Resident-General of Korea. He consented to the total annexation of Korea in response to pressure from the increasingly powerful Imperial Army. Shortly thereafter, he resigned as Resident-General in 1909 and assumed office once again as President of the Imperial Privy Council. Four months later, Itō was assassinated by Korean-independence activist and nationalist An Jung-geun in Manchuria. The annexation process was formalised by another treaty the following year after Ito's death. Through his daughter Ikuko, Itō was the father-in-law of politician, intellectual and author Suematsu Kenchō.

Early years

Hayashi Risuke was born on October 16, 1841, in Tsukari, Kumage, Suō Province (present-day Hikari, Yamaguchi Prefecture), the eldest son of farmer Hayashi Jūzō and his wife Kotoko. After his father went bankrupt and left for Hagi, Yamaguchi in 1846, he went to live at his mother's parental home. In 1849, Jūzō invited the family to Hagi and the family reunited. There Risuke entered Kubo Gorō Saemon's school. Because the family was poor, when Risuke was 12, Jūzō was adopted by samurai servant Mizui Buhē. In 1854, Mizui Buhē was adopted by samurai foot soldier (ashigaru) Itō Yaemon from Aihata, Saba. Mizui Buhē was renamed Itō Naoemon, Jūzō took the name Itō Jūzō, and Hayashi Risuke was renamed Itō Shunsuke at first, then Itō Hirobumi. These adoptions allowed both Hirobumi and his father Jūzō to rise to the samurai class and become ashigaru. Jūzō was the biological son of Hayashi Sukezaemon (林助左衛門), a 5th generation descendant of Hayashi Nobuyoshi (林信吉) who was a member of the Hayashi clan of Owari (尾張林氏).

He was a student of Yoshida Shōin at the Shōka Sonjuku and later joined the Sonnō jōi movement ("to revere the Emperor and expel the barbarians"), together with Katsura Kogorō. Active in the movement, he took part in an incendiary attack of the British legation on 31 January 1863 led by Takasugi Shinsaku, and in the company of Yamao Yōzō attacked and mortally wounded the head of the Wagakukōdansho institute on 2 February 1863, believing a false report that the institute was looking into ways of toppling the Emperor. Itō was chosen as one of the Chōshū Five who studied at University College London in 1863, and the experience in Great Britain eventually convinced him Japan needed to adopt Western ways.

In 1864, Itō returned to Japan with fellow student Inoue Kaoru to attempt to warn Chōshū Domain against going to war with the foreign powers (the Bombardment of Shimonoseki) over the right of passage through the Straits of Shimonoseki. At that time, he met Ernest Satow for the first time, later a lifelong friend.

Political career

Rise to power 

After the Meiji Restoration of 1868, Itō was appointed governor of Hyōgo Prefecture, junior councilor for Foreign Affairs, and sent to the United States in 1870 to study Western currency systems. Returning to Japan in 1871, he established Japan's taxation system. With the advice of Edmund Morel, a chief engineer of the railway department, Ito endeavored to found the Public Works together with Yamao Yozo. Later that year, he was sent on the Iwakura Mission around the world as vice-envoy extraordinary, during which he won the confidence of Ōkubo Toshimichi, one of the leaders of the Meiji government.

In 1873, Itō was made a full councilor, Minister of Public Works, and in 1875 chairman of the first Assembly of Prefectural Governors. He participated in the Osaka Conference of 1875. After Ōkubo's assassination, he took over the post of Home Minister and secured a central position in the Meiji government. By 1881, he successfully pushed for the resignation of Ōkuma Shigenobu, thereby allowing him to emerge as the de facto leader of the Meiji government. 

Itō went to Europe in 1882 to study the constitutions of those countries, spending nearly 18 months away from Japan. While working on a constitution for Japan, he also wrote the first Imperial Household Law and established the Japanese peerage system (kazoku) in 1884.

In 1885, he negotiated the Convention of Tientsin with Li Hongzhang, normalizing Japan's diplomatic relations with Qing-dynasty China. In the same year, In 1885, Itō established a cabinet system of government based on European ideas, replacing the Daijō-kan as the nation's main policy-making organization.

As Prime Minister 

On 22 December 1885, Itō became the first prime minister of Japan. On 30 April 1888, Itō resigned as prime minister, but headed the new Privy Council to maintain power behind-the-scenes. In 1889, he also became the first genrō. The Meiji Constitution was promulgated in February 1889. He had added to it the references to the kokutai or "national polity" as the justification of the emperor's authority through his divine descent and the unbroken line of emperors, and the unique relationship between subject and sovereign. This stemmed from his rejection of some European notions as unfit for Japan, as they stemmed from European constitutional practice and Christianity.

He remained a powerful force while Kuroda Kiyotaka and Yamagata Aritomo, his political nemeses, were prime ministers.

During Itō's second term as prime minister (8 August 1892 – 31 August 1896), he supported the First Sino-Japanese War and negotiated the Treaty of Shimonoseki in March 1895 with his ailing foreign minister Mutsu Munemitsu. In the Anglo-Japanese Treaty of Commerce and Navigation of 1894, he succeeded in removing some of the onerous unequal treaty clauses that had plagued Japanese foreign relations since the start of the Meiji period.

During Itō's third term as prime minister (12 January – 30 June 1898), he was forced to contend with the rise of political parties. Both the Liberal Party and the Shimpotō opposed his proposed new land taxes, and in retaliation, Itō dissolved the Diet and called for new elections. As a result, both parties merged into the Kenseitō, won a majority of the seats, and forced Itō to resign. This lesson taught Itō the need for a pro-government political party, so he organized the Rikken Seiyūkai (Constitutional Association of Political Friendship) in 1900. Itō's womanizing was a popular theme in editorial cartoons and in parodies by contemporary comedians, and was used by his political enemies in their campaign against him.

Itō returned to office as prime minister for a fourth term from 19 October 1900, to 10 May 1901, this time facing political opposition from the House of Peers. Weary of political back-stabbing, he resigned in 1901, but remained as head of the Privy Council as the premiership alternated between Saionji Kinmochi and Katsura Tarō.

Toward the end of August 1901, Itō announced his intention of visiting the United States to recuperate. This turned into a long journey in the course of which he visited the major cities of the United States and Europe. He set off from Yokohama on 18 September, traveled through the U.S. to New York City, and received an honorary doctorate (LL.D.) from Yale University in late October.) He then sailed to Boulogne, reaching Paris on 4 November. On 25 November, he reached Saint Petersburg, having been asked by the new prime minister, Katsura Tarō, to sound out the Russians, entirely unofficially, on their intentions in the Far East. Japan hoped to achieve what it called Man-Kan kōkan, the exchange of a free hand for Russia in Manchuria for a free hand for Japan in Korea, but Russia, feeling greatly superior to Japan and unwilling to give up the use of Korean ports for its navy, was in no mood to compromise. Foreign minister Vladimir Lamsdorf "thought that time was on the side of his country because of the [Trans-Siberian] railway and there was no need to make concessions to the Japanese". Itō left empty-handed for Berlin (where he received honors from Kaiser Wilhelm), Brussels, and London. Meanwhile, Katsura had decided that Man-Kan kōkan was no longer desirable for Japan, which should not renounce activity in Manchuria. In Britain, Ito met with Lord Lansdowne, which helped lay the groundwork for the Anglo-Japanese Alliance announced early the following year. The failure of his mission to Russia was "one of the most important events in the run-up to the Russo-Japanese War".

While Prime Minister, Ito invited Professor George Trumbull Ladd of Yale University to serve as a diplomatic adviser to promote mutual understanding between Japan and the United States. Lectures delivered by Ladd in Japan revolutionized its educational methods; he was the first foreigner to receive the Third Class honor (conferred by the Emperor in 1899) and the Second Class honor (in 1907) in the Orders of the Rising Sun. He later wrote a book on his personal experiences in Korea and with Resident-General Itō. When Ladd died, half his ashes were buried in a Buddhist temple in Tokyo and a monument was erected to him.

As Resident-General of Korea

In November 1905, following the Russo-Japanese War, the Japan–Korea Treaty of 1905 was made between the Empire of Japan and the Empire of Korea, making Korea a Japanese protectorate. After the treaty had been signed, Itō became the first Resident-General of Korea on 21 December 1905. In 1907, he urged Emperor Gojong to abdicate in favor of his son Sunjong and secured the Japan–Korea Treaty of 1907, thereby giving Japan authority to dictate Korea's internal affairs.

While Itō was firmly against Korea falling into China or Russia's sphere of influence, he also opposed its annexation, advocating instead that the territory should be treated as a protectorate. When the cabinet voted in favor of annexing Korea, he proposed that the process be delayed in the hopes that the decision could eventually be reversed. However, Itō ultimately changed his mind 
and approved plans to have the region annexed on 10 April 1909. Despite changing his position, he was forced to resign on 14 June 1909 by the Imperial Japanese Army (one of the foremost advocates for Korea's annexation). His assassination is believed to have accelerated the path to the Japan–Korea Annexation Treaty.

Assassination 
Itō arrived at the Harbin railway station on 26 October 1909 for a meeting with Vladimir Kokovtsov, a Russian representative in Manchuria. There An Jung-geun, a Korean nationalist and independence activist, fired six shots, three of which hit Itō in the chest. He died shortly thereafter. His body was returned to Japan on the Imperial Japanese Navy cruiser , and he was accorded a state funeral. An Jung-geun later listed "15 reasons why Itō should be killed" at his trial.

Legacy

In Japan 

A portrait of Itō Hirobumi was on the obverse of the Series C 1,000 yen note from 1963 until a new series was issued in 1984. Itō's former house in Shinagawa, Tokyo has been transported to the site of his childhood home in Yamaguchi prefecture. It is now preserved as a museum near the Shōin Jinja in Hagi. The publishing company Hakubunkan takes its name from Hakubun, an alternate pronunciation of Itō's given name.

In Korea 
The Annals of Sunjong record that Gojong held a positive view of Itō's governorship. In an entry for 28 October 1909, almost three years after being forced to abdicate his throne, the former emperor praised Itō, who had died two days earlier, for his efforts to develop Japanese civilization in Korea. However, the integrity of Joseon  dated after the Japan–Korea Treaty of 1905 is considered dubious by Korean scholars due to the influence exerted over record-keeping by the Japanese.

Itō has been portrayed several times in Korean cinema. His assassination was the subject of North Korea's An Jung-gun Shoots Ito Hirobumi in 1979 and South Korea's Thomas Ahn Joong Keun in 2004; both films made his assassin An Jung-geun the protagonist. The 1973 South Korean film Femme Fatale: Bae Jeong-ja is a biopic of Itō's adopted Korean daughter Bae Jeong-ja (1870–1950).

Itō argued the Pan-Asian view that if East Asians did not co-operate closely with one another, Japan, Korea and China would all fall victim to Western imperialism. Initially, Gojong and the Joseon government shared that belief and agreed to collaborate with the Japanese military. Korean intellectuals had predicted that the victor of the Russo-Japanese War would assume hegemony over their peninsula, and as an Asian power, Japan enjoyed greater public support in Korea than Russia. However, policies such as land confiscation and the drafting of forced labor turned popular opinion against the Japanese, a trend exacerbated by the arrest or execution of those who resisted. Ironically, An Jung-geun was also a proponent of what was later called Pan-Asianism. He believed in a union of the three East Asian nations to repel Western imperialism and restore peace in the region.

Ito memorial temple built by Japanese

On October 26, 1932, the Japanese unveiled in Seoul the Hakubun-ji 博文寺 Buddhist Temple dedicated to Prince Ito. Full official name "Prince Ito Memorial Temple (伊藤公爵祈念寺院)". Situated in then Susumu Tadashidan Park on the north slope of Namsan, which after liberation became Jangchungdan Park 장충단 공원. From October 1945, the main hall served as student home, ca. 1960 replaced by a guest house of the Park Chung-Hee administration, then reconstructed and again a student guest house. In 1979 it was incorporated into the grounds of the Shilla Hotel then opened. Several other parts of the temple are still at the site.

Genealogy
 Hayashi family
　∴Hayashi Awajinokami
Michioki
　┃
　┣━━━━━━━┳━━━━━━━┳━━━━━━━━━━━━━━━━┳━━━━━━━━┳━━━━━━━━━┳━━━━━━━┳━━━━━━━━┓
　┃　　　　┃　　　　┃Hayasi Magoemon ┃　　　　　┃　　　　　┃　　　　┃　　　　　┃
Michimoto　Michiyo　Michisige　　　　　Michiyoshi　Michisada　Michikata　Michinaga　Michisue
　　　　　　　　　　　┃
　　　　　　　　　　　┃
　　　　　　　　　　　┃Hayasi Magosaburō
　　　　　　　　　　Nobukatsu
　　　　　　　　　　　┃
　　　　　　　　　　　┃
　　　　　　　　　　　┃Hayasi Magoemon
　　　　　　　　　　Nobuyoshi
　　　　　　　　　　　┃
　┏━━━━━━━━━━━━━━━━╋━━━━━━━━━┳━━━━━━━┓
　┃Hayasi Magoemon ┃　　　　　┃　　　　┃
Nobuaki　　　　　　Sakuzaemon　Sojyurō　 Matazaemon
　┃　　　　　　　　　　　　　　　　　　　　┃
　┃　　　　　　　　　　　　　　　　　　　　┃
　┃Hayasi Hanroku　　　　　　　　　　　　┃
Nobuhisa　　　　　　　　　　　　　　　　 Genzō
　┃　　　　　　　　　　　　　　　　　　　　┃
　┣━━━━━━━━━┓　　　　　　　　　　　　　　┃
　┃　　　　　┃　　　　　　　　　　　　　　┃
Sōzaemon　　Heijihyōe　　　　　　　　　　Yoichiemon
　　　　　　　┃　　　　　　　　　　　　　　┃
　┏━━━━━━━━━┻━━━━━━┓　　　　　　┏━━━━━┫
　┃Hayasi Hanroku　┃　　　　　　┃　　　┃
Rihachirō　　　　　Riemon　　　　Masuzō　Sukezaemon
　　　　　　　　　　　　　　　　　　　　　　┃adopted son of Hayasi Rihachirō
　　　　　　┏━━━━┳━━━━━━━━━━━━━━━━━━━━━━┫
　　　　　　┃Itō ┃Hayasi Shinbei's wife ┃Morita Naoyoshi's wife
　　　　　Jyuzō　woman　　　　　　　　　　woman
　　　　　　┃
　　　　　　┃
　　　　　　┃'''Itō
　　　　　Hirobumi'''
　　　　　　┃
　┏━━━━━━━╋━━━━━━━━┳━━━━━━━┳━━━━━┓
　┃Itō 　　┃Kida　　┃Itō 　　┃　　　┃
Hirokuni　Humiyoshi　Shinichi　woman　woman
　┃
　┣━━━━━━━┳━━━━━━━━━┳━━━━━━━━━━┳━━━━━━┳━━━━━━━┳━━━━━━━━┳━━━━━━━┳━━━━━━━━━┳━━━━━━━━┳━━━━━━━━━┳━━━━━┳━━━┓
　┃Itō 　　┃Shimizu ┃Itō　　　　 ┃Itō　 ┃Itō　　 ┃Itō　　 ┃Itō　　 ┃Itō　　　 ┃Itō　　 ┃Itō　　　 ┃　　　┃　　┃
Hirotada　 Hiroharu　Hiromichi　 Hiroya　Hirotada　Hiroomi　Hironori　Hirotsune　Hirotaka　Hirohide　woman　woman　woman
　┃
　┣━━━━━━━┳━━━━━┳━━━━┳━━━━━┳━━━┓
　┃Itō　　 ┃　　　┃　　┃　　　┃　　┃
Hiromasa　 woman　woman　woman　woman　woman
　┃
　┣━━━━━━━┓
　┃Itō　　 ┃
Tomoaki　　woman

 Itō family
　∴
Itō Yaemon
　┃
Itō Naoemon (Mizui Buhei)Yaemon's adopted son
　┃
Itō Jyuzō (Hayashi Jyuzo)Naoemon's adopted son
　┃
Itō Hirobumi (Hayashi Risuke)

Honours
From the Japanese Wikipedia article

Japanese

Peerages
Count (7 July 1884)
Marquess (5 August 1895)
Prince (21 September 1907)

Decorations
 Grand Cordon of the Order of the Rising Sun (2 November 1877)
 Grand Cordon of the Order of the Rising Sun with Paulownia Flowers (11 February 1889)
 Grand Cordon of the Order of the Chrysanthemum (5 August 1895)
 Collar of the Order of the Chrysanthemum (1 April 1906)

Court ranks
Fifth rank, junior grade (1868)
Fifth rank (1869)
Fourth rank (1870)
Senior fourth rank (18 February 1874)
Third rank (27 December 1884)
Second rank (19 October 1886)
Senior second rank (20 December 1895)
Junior First Rank (26 October 1909; posthumous)

Foreign
 :
 Knight 1st Class of the Order of the Crown (1886)
 Grand Cross of the Order of the Red Eagle (22 December 1886); in Brilliants (December 1901)
 : Grand Cross of the Order of the White Falcon (29 September 1882)
 :
 Knight of the Order of the White Eagle (17 September 1883)
 Knight of the Order of St. Alexander Nevsky (19 March 1896); in Brilliants (28 November 1901)
   Sweden-Norway: Commander Grand Cross of the Order of Vasa (25 May 1885)
 : Knight 1st Class of the Order of the Iron Crown (27 September 1885)
  Siam: Grand Cross of the Order of the Crown of Siam (24 January 1888)
 : Grand Cross of the Order of Charles III (26 October 1896)
 : Grand Cordon of the Royal Order of Leopold (4 October 1897)
 : Grand Cross of the Legion of Honour (29 April 1898)
 : Order of the Double Dragon, Class I Grade III (5 December 1898)
 : Honorary Grand Cross of the Order of the Bath (civil division) (14 January 1902)
 : Knight of the Supreme Order of the Most Holy Annunciation (16 January 1902)
 : Grand Cordon of the Order of the Golden Ruler (18 April 1904)

Popular culture
 Portrayed by Hisaya Morishige in 1980 Japanese movie The Battle of Port Arthur.
 Portrayed by Yoon Joo-sang in the 2001-2002 KBS TV series Empress Myeongseong.
 Portrayed by Gō Katō in the 2009-2011 NHK TV series Saka no Ue no Kumo.
 Portrayed by Hiroyuki Onoue in 2010 NHK TV series Ryōmaden.
 Portrayed by Yukiyoshi Ozawa in the 2014 Japanese movie Rurouni Kenshin: The Legend Ends
 Portrayed by Hitori Gekidan in the 2015 NHK TV series Hana Moyu.
 Portrayed by Kenta Hamano in the 2018 NHK TV series Segodon.
 Portrayed by Kim In-woo in the 2018 tvN and Netflix TV series Mr. Sunshine.

See also

 Japanese students in Britain

References

Sources
 Nish, Ian. (1998) The Iwakura Mission to America and Europe: A New Assessment. Richmond, Surrey: Japan Library.  ; ; OCLC 40410662

Further reading 
 Edward, I. "Japan's Decision to Annex Taiwan: A Study of Itō-Mutsu Diplomacy, 1894–95." Journal of Asian Studies 37#1 (1977): 61–72.
 Hamada Kengi (1936). Prince Ito. Tokyo: Sanseido Co.
 Johnston, John T.M. (1917). World patriots. New York: World Patriots Co.
 Kusunoki Sei'ichirō (1991). Nihon shi omoshiro suiri: Nazo no satsujin jiken wo oe. Tokyo: Futami bunko.
 Ladd, George T. (1908).   In Korea with Marquis Ito
 Nakamura Kaju (1910). Prince Ito, the man and the statesman, a brief history of his life. New York: Japanese-American commercial weekly and Anraku Pub. Co.
 Palmer, Frederick (1910). Marquis Ito: the great man of Japan. n.p.

External links 

 
 About Japan: A Teacher's Resource Ideas about how to teach about Ito Hirobumi in a K-12 classroom
 
 

|-

|-

|-

|-

|-

|-

|-

|-

|-

|-

|-

|-

1841 births
1909 deaths
19th-century prime ministers of Japan
20th-century prime ministers of Japan
Alumni of University College London
Assassinated prime ministers of Japan
Assassinated Japanese politicians
Grand Crosses of the Order of Vasa
Deaths by firearm in China
Grand Croix of the Légion d'honneur
Honorary Knights Grand Cross of the Order of the Bath
Japanese atheists
Japanese diplomats
Japanese expatriates in the United Kingdom
Japanese imperialism and colonialism
Japanese people murdered abroad
Japanese people of the Russo-Japanese War
Japanese Residents-General of Korea
Kazoku
Members of the House of Peers (Japan)
Mōri retainers
Nobles of the Meiji Restoration
People from Chōshū domain
People murdered in China
People of the First Sino-Japanese War
Prime Ministers of Japan
Recipients of the Order of the Rising Sun with Paulownia Flowers
Rikken Seiyūkai politicians
20th-century Japanese politicians
Samurai
Foreign ministers of Japan
Deified Japanese people
Members of the Iwakura Mission
Politicians from Yamaguchi Prefecture